Frederick Emil Vollrath (July 16, 1940 – January 1, 2017) was a United States Army lieutenant general who served as Deputy Chief of Staff G-1 Personnel of The United States Army from 1996 to 1998. From 2012 to 2014, he served as Assistant Secretary of Defense for Readiness and Force Management. Vollrath died in 2017.

Education
Vollrath received a bachelor's degree in management from the University of Miami in 1962. He later earned a master's degree in personnel management from Central Michigan University.

References

External links

1940 births
2017 deaths
People from Miami Beach, Florida
Military personnel from Florida
University of Miami Business School alumni
Central Michigan University alumni
United States Army generals
Burials at Arlington National Cemetery